Lee Seung-Ho (Hangul: 이승호, Hanja: 李承浩) (born August 23, 1976 in Seoul, South Korea) is a South Korean baseball relief pitcher for the SK Wyverns of the KBO League. He bats and throws left-handed.

References 

SSG Landers players
LG Twins players
KBO League pitchers
South Korean baseball players
1976 births
Living people